The Pan American Championship was the major international rugby tournament held in the Americas, hosted irregularly on five occasions from 1995 to 2003. The tournament was organized by the Pan American Rugby Association (PARA) and included the World Cup teams of Argentina, Canada and Uruguay in 1995, joined by the United States from 1996 onwards. Argentina won all five of the tournaments.

Results

References

See also
Americas Rugby Championship

 
Rugby union competitions in North America
Rugby union competitions in South America
Defunct rugby union competitions for national teams
1995 establishments in North America
1995 establishments in South America